DNA fragmentation factor subunit alpha (DFFA), also known as Inhibitor of caspase-activated DNase (ICAD), is a protein that in humans is encoded by the DFFA gene.

Apoptosis is a cell death process that removes toxic and/or useless cells during mammalian development. The apoptotic process is accompanied by shrinkage and fragmentation of the cells and nuclei and degradation of the chromosomal DNA into nucleosomal units. DNA fragmentation factor (DFF) is a heterodimeric protein of 40-kD (DFFB) and 45-kD (DFFA) subunits. DFFA is the substrate for caspase-3 and triggers DNA fragmentation during apoptosis. DFF becomes activated when DFFA is cleaved by caspase-3. The cleaved fragments of DFFA dissociate from DFFB, the active component of DFF. DFFB has been found to trigger both DNA fragmentation and chromatin condensation during apoptosis. Two alternatively spliced transcript variants encoding distinct isoforms have been found for this gene.

The C-terminal domain of DFFA (DFF-C) consists of four alpha-helices, which are folded in a helix-packing arrangement, with alpha-2 and alpha-3 packing against a long C-terminal helix (alpha-4). The main function of this domain is the inhibition of DFFB by binding to its C-terminal catalytic domain through ionic interactions, thereby inhibiting the fragmentation of DNA in the apoptotic process. In addition to blocking the DNase activity of DFFB, the C-terminal region of DFFA is also important for the DFFB-specific folding chaperone activity, as demonstrated by the ability of DFFA to refold DFFB.

Interactions 

DFFA has been shown to interact with DFFB.

References

Further reading 

 
 
 
 
 
 
 
 
 
 
 
 
 
 
 
 
 

Protein domains